Stizus fasciatus is a species of sand wasps belonging to the family Crabronidae.

Description
Head and thorax are black, while the abdomen shows yellow and black bands. Wings are darkened.

Biology
Adults can be found in June and August. Females build a nest with several cells in the sandy soil. Then they lay eggs on the body of paralyzed grasshoppers.

Distribution and habitat
This species can be found in most of southern Europe, in North Africa and in the Near East up to China (Russia, France, Spain, Italy, Croatia, Montenegro, Serbia, Greece, Romania, Bulgaria, Cyprus, Ukraine, Turkey, Israel, Kazakhstan, Uzbekistan, Turkmenistan, Tajikistan, Iran, Mongolia, China, Morocco, Algeria, Egypt). These wasps prefers xerophytic areas.

References 

Crabronidae
Fauna of Ukraine
Arthropods of Israel
Insects described in 1781